Stacey Richter is an American writer of short fiction. Richter has been the recipient of four Pushcart Prizes, a National Prize for Fiction and the National Magazine Award. Her first collection of stories, My Date with Satan was published in 1999. In 2008, Richter published her second collection, Twin Study, which includes the Pushcart Award-winning story "The Land of Pain".

Richter was born in Prince George's County, Maryland on April 3, 1965, the daughter of Valerie and Herschel Richter, a cardiologist. She was raised in Phoenix, Arizona. Richter earned a Bachelor of Arts in History from the University of California, Berkeley and a Master's in Creative Writing from Brown University. She has resided in Tucson since 1992.

Works
Story collections
 Twin Study, 2008 
 My Date with Satan, 1999

References

External links

Interviews
 Fringe interview with Elizabeth Stark
 NPR interview with Robrt Pela
 Short Story: "My Date With Satan" on Fictionaut

1965 births
Living people
Writers from Phoenix, Arizona